William Henry and Lilla Luce Harrison House, also known as the Dr. Samuel Harris House, is a historic home located at Cape Girardeau, Missouri.  It was built in 1897, and is a -story, free classic Queen Anne style brick dwelling.  It has a steeply pitched side-gable roof with projecting dormers.  It features a wraparound porch with circular verandah added between 1900 and 1908.

It was listed on the National Register of Historic Places in 2005. It is located in the Courthouse-Seminary Neighborhood Historic District.

References

Individually listed contributing properties to historic districts on the National Register in Missouri
Houses on the National Register of Historic Places in Missouri
Queen Anne architecture in Missouri
Houses completed in 1897
Houses in Cape Girardeau County, Missouri
National Register of Historic Places in Cape Girardeau County, Missouri